Bob Crocker (August 3, 1928 – December 22, 2018) was an American ice hockey scout, former coach and executive. He was awarded the Lester Patrick Award, for contributions to hockey in the United States, in 2015.

Born in East Boston, Massachusetts, Crocker attended Boston University, where he played hockey in the 1954–55 season for the Boston University Terriers. He later served as a recruiter and freshman coach for his alma mater. From 1972 to 1976, he coached the University of Pennsylvania men's hockey team. In 1980, he was hired as an assistant general manager of the Hartford Whalers; he would serve in that position until 1992, when he went to scout for the New York Rangers. Crocker scouted for the Rangers until 2005, when he joined the Los Angeles Kings organization. He won three Stanley Cups during his time with the Rangers and Kings, and a Calder Cup with the Hartford Wolf Pack of the AHL. In 2006, he was inducted into the Massachusetts Hockey Hall of Fame.

College Head coaching record

References

External links

1928 births
2018 deaths
Boston University Terriers men's ice hockey coaches
Boston University Terriers men's ice hockey players
Hartford Whalers coaches
Ice hockey people from Massachusetts
Lester Patrick Trophy recipients
Los Angeles Kings scouts
New York Rangers scouts
People from East Boston, Boston
People from Centerville, Massachusetts
Penn Quakers men's ice hockey coaches
Sportspeople from Barnstable County, Massachusetts
Sportspeople from Boston
Ice hockey coaches from Massachusetts